The 2007–08 Moldovan "A" Division season is the 17th since its establishment. A total of 17 teams are contesting the league:

League table

References

External links
Divizia A  -  2007/2008 at weltfussballarchiv.com
Divizia A - Moldova - Results, fixtures, tables and news - Soccerway

Moldovan Liga 1 seasons
2007–08 in Moldovan football
Moldova